The Pan American Chess Championship, also American continental Championship is an individual chess tournament organized since 1945.

First pan American championships (1945 and 1954) 
The first Pan American Chess Championship was held in Hollywood, 28 July – 12 August 1945. The line-up was as follows:
 1. Samuel Reshevsky  10.5,
 2. Reuben Fine  9,
 3. Hermann Pilnik  8.5,
 4. Israel Horowitz  8,
 5. Isaac Kashdan  7,
 6. Héctor Rossetto  6.5,
 7–8. Weaver Adams , Herman Steiner  5.5,
 9–10. Walter Cruz , José Joaquin Araiza  5, 
 11. Jose Broderman  3.5,
 12. Herbert Seidman  3,
 13. Joaquin Camarena  1.

The second championship was held in 1954 in Los Angeles and was an open tournament.

Winners

Pan American Championship 

{| class="sortable wikitable"
! # !! Year !! City !! Winner
|-
| 1* || 1945  || Hollywood   ||   
|-
| 2* || 1954  || Los Angeles ||    
|-
| 3*  || 1958 || Bogotá  ||  
|-
| 4*  || 1963 || Havana   ||   
|-
| 5*  || 1966 || Havana    ||   
|-
| 6*  || 1968 ||  Cárdenas || 
|-
| 7*  || 1970 || Havana   ||   
|-
| || ||
|-
| 1 || 1974 || Winnipeg  ||  
|-
| 2 || 1977 || Santa Cruz || 
|-
| 3 || 1981 || San Pedro || 
|-
| 4 || 1987 || La Paz || 
|-
| 5 || 1988 ||  Havana || 
|-
| 6 || ? ||  ? ||
|-
| 7 || ? ||  ? ||
|-
| 8 || 1998 || San Felipe || 
|-
|}

American Continental Chess Championship 
The American Continental Chess Championship qualified in 2001 and 2003 the top seven players for the FIDE World Championships. From 2005, this tournament has been played as a qualifier for the World Cup stage of the World Championship. The number of players who qualified changed in the various editions. In 2005, the top seven players qualified for the Chess World Cup 2005. In 2014 and 2015 the top four earned a spot in the Chess World Cup 2015.

{| class="sortable wikitable"
! # !! Year !! City !! Winner
|-
| 1 || 2001 || Cali || 
|-
| 2 || 2003 || Buenos Aires || 
|-
| 3 || 2005 || Buenos Aires || 
|-
| 4 || 2007 || Cali || 
|-
| *  || 2008 || Boca Raton ||  
|-
| 5  || 2009 || São Paulo || 
|-
| * || 2010 || Cali || 
|-
| 6 || 2011 || Toluca || 
|-
| 7 || 2012 || Mar del Plata ||  
|-
| 8 || 2013 || Cochabamba || 
|-
| 9 || 2014 || Natal, Rio Grande do Norte || 
|-
| 10 || 2015 || Montevideo || 
|-
| 11 || 2016 || San Salvador || 
|-
| 12 || 2017 || Medellín || 
|-
| 13 || 2018 || Montevideo || 
|-
| 14  || 2019 || São Paulo || 
|-
| ?  || ? || ? || ?
|-
| 15  || 2022 || San Salvador || 
|}

*Note: 2008 and 2010 editions' official name was Campeonato Panamericano-Continental, instead of Campeonato Continental de las Americas'' as the others.

American Continental Women's Championship
The American Continental Women's Chess Championship serves as a qualifier for the knockout Women's World Chess Championship.

{| class="sortable wikitable"
! # !! Year !! City !! Winner
|-
| 1 || 2001 || Mérida || 
|-
| 2 || 2003 || San Cristobal || 
|-
| 3 || 2005 || Guatemala || 
|-
| 4 || 2007 || Potrero de los Funes ||  
|-
| 5 || 2009 || Cali || 
|-
| 6 || 2011 || Guayaquil || 
|-
| 7 || 2014 || Buenos Aires || 
|-
| 8 || 2016 || Lima || 
|-
| 9 || 2017 || Villa Martelli || 
|-
| 10 || 2018 || Envigado || 
|-
| 11 || 2019 || Aguascalientes || 
|-
|}
In 2007 Marisa Zuriel won a rapid playoff with Sarai Sanchez Castillo to qualify for the world championship but the Champion of the tournament was Sarai Sanchez:

Pan American Women's Championship 
{| class="sortable wikitable"
! # !! Year !! City !! Winner
|-
|1  || 	1980  || Córdoba  || 	 
|-
|2  || 	1996  || Bogotá  || 	 
|-
|3  || 	1997  || Mérida  ||  
|-
|4  || 	1998  || San Felipe  ||  
|-
|5  || 	1999  || San Felipe  ||  
|-
|6  || 	2000  || Mérida  ||  
|-
|7  || 	2006  || San Salvador  ||  
|-
|8  || 	2008  || San Salvador  ||  
|-
|9  || 	2010  || Campinas  ||  
|-
|10  || 2012  || Montevideo  ||  
|-
|11  || 2014  || Palmira  ||  
|-
|12 || 2016 || Manzanillo, Colima || 
|}

References
BrasilBase: Campeonatos Panamericanos 
Complete standings on Chess-Results: 2007, 2009, 2010, 2012, 2013, 2014, 2015
FIDE: 2011
Results from The Week in Chess: 2001, 2003, 2005, 2007, 2008
American Continental Women's Championship standings: 2001, 2003, 2005, 2007, 2009, 2011, 2014

Notes

Further reading

External links
2003 on uschess.org
2005 edition, Chessbase
On the championship as qualifier
Biography on Eleazar Jiménez
Biography on Silvino Garcia Martinez

American Championship
1945 in chess
1974 in chess
Recurring sporting events established in 1974
Chess Championship
Chess in North America
Chess in South America